Masters W60 shot put world record progression is the progression of world record improvements of the shot put W60 division of Masters athletics.  Records must be set in properly conducted, official competitions under the standing IAAF rules unless modified by World Masters Athletics.  

The W60 division consists of female athletes who have reached the age of 60 but have not yet reached the age of 65, so exactly from their 60th birthday to the day before their 65th birthday. The W60 division throws a 3 kg implement.

Key

References

Masters Athletics Shot Put list
All Time Athletics

Masters athletics world record progressions
Shot